Laghetto di Sassi Neri is a lake in the Province of Livorno, Tuscany, Italy.

Lakes of Tuscany